This List of Indigenous musicians in Canada includes musicians, DJs, and singers who are Indigenous peoples living in or from Canada, which includes First Nations people, Inuit, and Métis. They play diverse styles of music including Indigenous music of Canada.

Blues 
 Celeigh Cardinal (Métis)
 G. R. Gritt, also Greyson Gritt (Métis)
 Jani Lauzon (Métis)
 Quantum Tangle (Inuit)

Classical
 Timothy Archambault (Kichesipirini Algonquin First Nation), composer and flutist from Connecticut
 John Kim Bell (Kahnawake Mohawk), conductor, pianist, composer
 Jeremy Dutcher (Wolastoqiyik)

DJs 
 DJ Shub (Mohawk)
 DJ GEOSPHERE (Blackfoot|Treaty 7)

Country and folk 
Includes Canadian fiddling
 Aasiva (Inuk), indie folk singer-songwriter
 Susan Aglukark, ᓲᓴᓐ ᐊᒡᓘᒃᑲᖅ, Inuit folk, country, and pop singer
 Arlette Alcock (Métis)
 Don Amero (Métis)
 John Arcand (Métis)
 Jason Burnstick (Plains Cree)
 Celeigh Cardinal (Métis)
 Vern Cheechoo (Cree)
 Andy de Jarlis (Métis)
 Beatrice Deer (Inuk)
 Willie Dunn (Mi'kmaq)
 Ferron (Métis)
 Nadia Gaudet (Métis)
 Becky Han (Inuk)
 Joshua Haulli (Inuk)
 Lawrence "Teddy Boy" Houle (Métis)
 Tom Jackson (One Arrow Cree)
 The Jerry Cans (Inuit)
 Simeonie Keenainak (Inuk)
 Jess Lee (Métis)
 Lawrence "Wapistan" Martin (Cree)
 Charlie Panigoniak (Inuk)
 Tumasi Quissa (Inuk)
 Buffy Sainte-Marie (Piapot Cree)
 Morgan Toney (Mi'kmaq)
 Billy Thunderkloud & the Chieftones (Gitksan)
 Terry Uyarak (Inuk)

Inuit customary music 
This includes throat singing.
 Susan Aglukark, ᓲᓴᓐ ᐊᒡᓘᒃᑲᖅ, Inuit folk, country, and pop singer
 Madeleine Allakariallak (Inuk)
 Susan Avingaq (Inuk)
 The Jerry Cans (Inuit)
 Ruben Komangapik (Inuk)
 Shina Novalinga (Inuk)
 Quantum Tangle (Inuit)
 Riit, also Rita Claire Mike-Murphy (Inuk)
 Alacie Tullaugaq (Inuk)

Jazz
none yet

Opera 
 Joanna Burt (Métis/Saugeen Ojibway descent)

Pop and rock
 Anachnid (Oji-Cree, Mi'kmaq)
 Aysanabee (Oji-Cree)
 Beatrice Deer (Inuk)
 Digging Roots (Anishinaabe, Haudenosaunee)
 Elisapie (Inuk) 
 Kelly Fraser (Inuk) 
 Lucie Idlout (Inuk) 
 The Jerry Cans (Inuit)
 Quantum Tangle (Inuit)
 Riit, also Rita Claire Mike-Murphy (Inuk)
 Robbie Robertson (Mohawk)
 Leanne Betasamosake Simpson (Mississauga Nishnaabeg)
 Logan Staats (Mohawk)
 Leonard Sumner (Anishinaabe)
 Tanya Tagaq (Inuk)
 Julian Taylor (Mohawk)
 Willie Thrasher (Inuk)
 Twin Flames (Mohawk, Inuit, Métis, Algonquin, Cree) 
 Tom Wilson (Mohawk)
 Jayli Wolf (Saulteau)
 Terry Uyarak (Inuk)

Powwow music
 Fawn Wood (Cree, Salish)
 Northern Cree (Plains Cree)
 Black Bear Singers (Atikamekw)
 Young Spirit (Cree)

Rap and hip hop
 Boslen
 Digawolf (Dene, Tłı̨chǫ)
 JB the First Lady (Nuxalk, Onondaga)
 The Halluci Nation (Mohawk)
 Hyper-T (Inuk)
 Wab Kinew (Anishinaabe)
 Samian (Algonquin)
 Silla + Rise (Inuit)
 Snotty Nose Rez Kids (Haisla)
 Kinnie Starr (Mohawk)
 Joey Stylez (Ojibwe)

See also
 Indigenous music of North America
 List of Native American musicians, United States
 List of First Nations peoples
 :Category:First Nations musicians
 :Category:Inuit musicians
 :Category:Métis musicians

References

Indigenous
Lists of Canadian musicians
Indigenous
Indigenous peoples in Canada-related lists
Canada